Illya Yuriyovych Tsaryuk (born 2 August 2001) is a Ukrainian professional footballer who plays as a left-back for Ukrainian club Mariupol.

References

External links
 Profile on Mariupol official website
 
 

2001 births
Living people
People from Snizhne
Ukrainian footballers
Association football defenders
FC Mariupol players
Ukrainian Premier League players
Sportspeople from Donetsk Oblast